Henrik Nikolai Krøyer (22 March 1799 – 14 November 1870) was a Danish zoologist.

Born in Copenhagen, he was a brother of the composer Hans Ernst Krøyer. He started studying medicine at the University of Copenhagen in 1817, which he later changed to history and philology. While a student, he was a supporter of the Philhellenic movement, and he participated as a volunteer in the Greek War of Independence along with several fellow students.

Upon his return to Denmark, Krøyer gained an interest in zoology. In 1827, he took the position as assistant teacher in Stavanger, where he met, and later married, Bertha Cecilie Gjesdal. Bertha's sister, Ellen Cecilie Gjesdal, was deemed unfit to bring up her child, so Henrik and Bertha adopted the boy, who took on the name Peder Severin Krøyer, and later became a well-known painter.

Krøyer returned to Copenhagen in 1830 where he was employed as a teacher in natural history at the Military Academy. As the course lacked a textbook, Krøyer wrote and published  (1833).

During his career, he often travelled along the coasts of Denmark where he studied marine life, especially fish and crustaceans, and this resulted in his main work  ("The Fish of Denmark", 3 volumes, 1838-1853). Krøyer also founded the journal Naturhistorisk tidsskrift, for which he served as editor and to which he contributed numerous articles. During his life he visited most of the coasts of Western Europe as well as Newfoundland. But his health eventually deteriorated and in 1869 he had to take his leave of his position of head of the Natural Museum of Copenhagen which he had held since 1847. He gained the title of professor in 1853.

References

Further reading 
 Henrik Nikolai Krøyer, Erindringer af Henrik Krøyers Liv 1821-38 (1870).
 Gosch: Danmarks zoologiske Littteratur

1799 births
1870 deaths
Danish zoologists
Danish carcinologists
Philhellenes in the Greek War of Independence
University of Copenhagen alumni
Danish marine biologists